Mieczysław Wiśniewski (23 November 1892 – 10 October 1952) was a Polish footballer. He competed in the men's tournament at the 1924 Summer Olympics.

References

External links

1892 births
1952 deaths
Polish footballers
Poland international footballers
Olympic footballers of Poland
Footballers at the 1924 Summer Olympics
People from Monastyryska
Polish Austro-Hungarians
People from the Kingdom of Galicia and Lodomeria
Wisła Kraków players
MKS Cracovia (football) players
Association football goalkeepers